Sibynophis sagittarius, commonly known as Cantor's black-headed snake after Theodore Cantor, is a species of snake endemic to South Asia.

Geographic range 
It is found in central and northeastern India, Bhutan, Nepal, and Pakistan. It is uncertain whether the species occurs or has occurred in Bangladesh.

Description 
Adults may attain 28 cm (11 inches) in total length, with a tail 6 cm (2⅜ inches) long.

As the common name implies, the dorsal surface of the head, including the nape of the neck, is black or dark brown, followed by a thin yellow nuchal collar. Also, there are two large elongate yellowish spots, one on each side of the back of the head. The upper surface of the body is pale brown, and the sides of the body are darker brown or gray.  On each flank there is a thin black stripe separating the differently colored areas.  A series of small black dots, widely separated, run down the vertebral row of dorsal scales. The underside is yellow, with a black dot at each outer end of every ventral.

The smooth dorsal scales, which lack apical pits, are arranged in 17 rows. Ventrals 205–228; anal plate divided; subcaudals 56–70, divided (paired).

Habitat 
Sibynophis sagittarius is found in forests.

Behavior 
It is not arboreal, but rather hunts by day on the forest floor.

Diet 
It feeds on insects, frogs, skinks, and snakes.

Reproduction 
An oviparous species, it lays a clutch of as many as six eggs.

References

Further reading 
 Cantor, T. 1839. Spicilegium Serpentium Indicorum [second part]. Proc. Zool. Soc. London 1839: 49-55.
 Captain, A.; D. J. Gower, P. David & A. M. Bauer 2004 Taxonomic status of the colubrid snake Sibynophis subpunctatus (Dumeril, Bibron & Dumeril, 1854). Hamadryad 28 (1&2): 90-94
 Das, I. & Palden, J. 2000 A herpetological collection from Bhutan, with new country records. Herpetological Review 31 (4): 256-258

Sibynophis
Snakes of Asia
Reptiles of Bhutan
Reptiles of India
Reptiles of Nepal
Reptiles of Pakistan
Reptiles described in 1839
Taxa named by Theodore Edward Cantor